Elena Aleksandrovna Valova (born 4 January 1963) is a Russian former pair skater who competed internationally for the Soviet Union. With her then-husband Oleg Vasiliev, she is the 1984 Olympic champion, 1988 Olympic silver medalist, and three-time World Champion (1983, 1985, 1988). Their coach throughout their career was Tamara Moskvina.

Personal life 
Valova was born in Leningrad, Russian SFSR, to parents Alla Borisovna Valova and Aleksander Dmitrievich Valov. She graduated from the P.F. Lesgaft University of Sports. She and Vasiliev were married from 1984–1992. Valova is now remarried to German Galusha and has a son, Roman, born in 1996. She moved to Pittsburgh, Pennsylvania in 1997 and currently lives in Moon Township.

Career 

Valova began training at age seven under Tatiana Mishina, Alexei Mishin, and Nina Monahova. As a pair skater, she was coached by Tamara Moskvina, who partnered her with Oleg Vasiliev. The pair trained in Leningrad (Saint Petersburg).

Valova/Vasiliev's breakthrough came in the 1982–83 season. They won bronze at the Prize of Moscow News, gold at the 1982 Skate America, and then silver at the 1983 European Championships. The pair concluded their season by winning their first World title. They missed the 1983 national championships due to Vasiliev's broken jaw.

In 1984, Valova/Vasiliev won their first European title and then took gold at the 1984 Winter Olympics in Sarajevo. The deaths of several Soviet government officials, including one during the Olympics, cast a pall over the Soviet team and the athletes were told not to show too much joy. The pair took silver at their final event of the season, the 1984 World Championships.

In 1985, the pair won gold at both the European and World Championships but 1986 saw the emergence of the young Moscow pair Ekaterina Gordeeva / Sergei Grinkov. Although Valova/Vasiliev were awarded gold at the 1986 Europeans, they finished second to the Muscovites at both the 1986 and 1987 Worlds.

In their final amateur season, Valova/Vasiliev took silver at the 1988 Winter Olympics behind Gordeeva/Grinkov but then prevailed over the reigning Olympic champions at the 1988 World Championships. After winning their third World title, Valova/Vasiliev retired from ISU competition. After performing for a year in Igor Bobrin's ice theatre, they signed a U.S. contract – the first Soviets to do so without losing their citizenship. The pair performed together in various shows and events until the end of 1997.

Valova was awarded the Order of Friendship of Peoples (1984). She represented VSS Trud.

She currently teaches skating at the Robert Morris University Island Sports Center. She coached Kylie Gleason / Taylor Toth, who were the 2002 U.S. champions in juvenile pairs and the 2003 U.S. champions in intermediate pairs.

Programs 
(with Vasiliev)

1979–1988

1989–1997

Results

Amateur career with Vasiliev

Professional career with Vasiliev

References

External links 

 Valova-vasiliev.com (Archive.org)

1963 births
Living people
Russian female pair skaters
Soviet female pair skaters
Olympic figure skaters of the Soviet Union
Figure skaters at the 1984 Winter Olympics
Figure skaters at the 1988 Winter Olympics
Russian figure skating coaches
Olympic gold medalists for the Soviet Union
Olympic silver medalists for the Soviet Union
Figure skaters from Saint Petersburg
Olympic medalists in figure skating
World Figure Skating Championships medalists
European Figure Skating Championships medalists
Medalists at the 1984 Winter Olympics
Female sports coaches
Medalists at the 1988 Winter Olympics